Mo Said She Was Quirky is a novel by James Kelman first published in 2012 by Hamish Hamilton.  This novel is Kelman's first that is set in London, and also his first to feature a female principal character.

Plot
The novel is about Helen, a 27-year-old Glaswegian, who lives in London and works in a casino. Helen has one daughter, Sophie, from a previous relationship, and she lives with her boyfriend Mo, whose family is from Pakistan.

At the start of the story, Helen is taking a taxi-ride home from work.  She sees a homeless person walking past who she thinks is her brother Brian.  The novel then follows Helen for the next 24 hours of her life.

Reception
Writing in The Guardian, Adam Mars-Jones highlights what he sees as a lack of concrete details provided in Kelman's writing, which he likens to "The semi-arid ecology of Beckett's novels".

Boyd Tonkin of The Independent writes that Helen's casino workplace is "both a metaphor for winner-takes-all metropolitan life and keenly observed real workplace". He continues: "Kelman brings gentle humour and profound compassion to his tale of getting by in an unjust time and place."

References

2012 British novels
Novels by James Kelman
Hamish Hamilton books
Novels set in London